The Wafra Oil Field is an oil field located in the Great Burgan. It was discovered in 1984 and developed by Kuwait Oil Company. The oil field is operated and owned by Chevron Corporation.

References 

Oil fields of Kuwait